Schwanthaler:
 The Schwanthaler Family of Ried im Innkreis
 Ludwig (Michael Ritter von) Schwanthaler

German-language surnames
Austrian noble families
Artist families
Baroque sculptors
German people of Austrian descent